Greens may refer to:
Leaf vegetables such as collard greens, mustard greens, spring greens, winter greens, spinach, etc.

Politics

Supranational
 Green politics
 Green party, political parties adhering to Green politics
 Global Greens
 European Green Party

Established parties
 Green Party (disambiguation)
 The Greens (disambiguation)

Other
 Green Party of the United States
 Australian Greens
 Green armies, peasant-based groups participating in the Russian Civil War of 1917–23
 Green Movement (disambiguation)
 The Greens, an early 20th-century nationalist and separatist political and military movement in Montenegro
 Greens, a political faction and associated chariot-racing team in the Byzantine empire; involved in the deadly Nika riots of 532

Places
 Greens Farms, Connecticut, United States
 Greens Ledge Light on Long Island Sound, United States
 Greens Norton village in Northamptonshire, England
 Greens Pool beach on the south coast of Western Australia
 Greens Restaurant in San Francisco, California, United States
 Millennium Greens and Doorstep Greens, locally owned and managed public spaces in England
 Breckenridge Greens (Edmonton), Potter Greens, Suder Greens - neighbourhoods in Alberta, Canada

In sport
 Ashland Greens basketball team in Pennsylvania, United States
 Bentleigh Greens soccer team in a suburb of Melbourne, Victoria, Australia
 Baywood Greens public golf club in Long Neck, Delaware, United States
 Greens Worldwide sports management company
 Greens (golf), the very closely mown areas of a golf course around the holes, maintained by a Greenskeeper

Manufacturing
 A British brand of railway locomotives, road rollers and other products; see Thomas Green & Son

See also
 Green (disambiguation)